Alan Cawley (born 3 January 1982 in Sligo) is a retired Irish footballer.

Career
Before signing for Leeds United Cawley attended Summerhill College in Sligo. He began his career at Leeds United and had a spell at Sheffield Wednesday before returning to Ireland to sign for UCD. His impressive performances for the students earned him a move to Shelbourne where he won a league winners medal. He had loan spells at Longford Town and Waterford United before returning for a second spell at Belfield. Cawley made his debut for St Patrick's Athletic on 18 February 2009 vs a Chelsea XI, when he scored his first goal for the club, a wonderful free kick into the top left corner.

Cawley signed for Dundalk on 24 December 2009, making him newly-appointed manager Ian Foster's first signing at the club. Foster commented "I am pleased to be able to complete the first of my new signings for next season, and Alan is a player who has impressed me over the last couple of seasons. He is a natural footballer who revels in playing the ball on the ground and is a natural fit for the attacking style that I want to employ." After being plagued with injury throughout the 2010 season Cawley made only ten appearances. On 6 February Cawley signed for Portadown.

Cawley is Sligo native and has represented Ireland at all levels up to Under 18. He is a regular pundit on Soccer Republic on RTÉ television and on Game On, RTÉ 2FM radio's daily sports show from 6p.m.-7p.m. Monday to Friday.

Honours
Shelbourne
 League of Ireland (1): 2004

References

1982 births
Living people
People from Sligo (town)
Association footballers from County Sligo
Republic of Ireland association footballers
Republic of Ireland youth international footballers
University College Dublin A.F.C. players
Shelbourne F.C. players
Longford Town F.C. players
Waterford F.C. players
Bray Wanderers F.C. players
St Patrick's Athletic F.C. players
Dundalk F.C. players
League of Ireland players
Portadown F.C. players
NIFL Premiership players
People educated at Summerhill College
Belvedere F.C. players
Association football midfielders